Hildur Antonsdóttir (born 18 September 1995) is an Icelandic footballer who plays as a midfielder for Fortuna Sittard in the Eredivisie and the Iceland women's national team.

Club career
Hildur started her career with Valur but left the team midway through the 2016 season and joined Breiðablik. In May 2018, she was loaned to HK/Víkingur but two months later she was recalled and finished the season with Breiðablik.
In June 2020, Hildur tore her anterior cruciate ligament, resulting in her missing the rest of the season.
In 2022 she moves to Fortuna Sittard in the Netherlands, a new team in the Dutch Eredivisie Vrouwen. She signed a contract for two seasons.

National team career
Hildur has been capped for the Iceland national team. She received her first international call up in 2020, after Alexandra Jóhannsdóttir had to be withdrawn from the squad due to an injury.

Personal life
Hildur is the daughter of Ragnheiður Víkingsdóttir who played football with Valur and the Icelandic national football team. Her sister, Heiða Dröfn Antonsdóttir, played 92 games in the Úrvalsdeild from 2009 to 2016.

References

External links

1995 births
Living people
Women's association football midfielders
Hildur Antonsdóttir
Hildur Antonsdottir
Hildur Antonsdóttir
Hildur Antonsdóttir
Sportspeople from Reykjavík
Úrvalsdeild kvenna (football) players
Fortuna Sittard (women) players
Eredivisie (women) players